Japan–North Korea relations refers to international relations between Japan and North Korea. Relations between Japan and North Korea have never been formally established, but there have been diplomatic talks between the two governments to discuss the issue of kidnapped Japanese citizens and North Korea's nuclear program. Relations between the two countries are severely strained and marked by tension and hostility. According to a 2014 BBC World Service poll, 91% of Japanese people view North Korea's influence negatively, with just 1% expressing a positive view; the most negative perception of North Korea in the world.

History
 

In the first years after the proclamation of the North Korean state, relations between Pyongyang and Tokyo were mostly hostile and practically non-existent. In 1949–1950, the North Korean leadership vehemently condemned the economic and political negotiations between Japan and the administration of Syngman Rhee. Later, however, North Korea sought to take advantage of the conflict that erupted between Japan and South Korea over the Syngman Rhee Line. In response to the initiative of Japanese Prime Minister Ichirō Hatoyama, who sought to achieve a rapprochement with the Soviet Union and other Communist countries, in February 1955 North Korean Foreign Minister Nam Il issued a statement calling for economic and cultural cooperation with Japan. From 1955 to 1964, Japanese-North Korean economic relations underwent gradual expansion, partly because Pyongyang sought to prevent a Japanese-South Korean rapprochement by adopting a cooperative attitude toward Tokyo, and partly because North Korea tried to reduce its economic dependence on the Soviet Union.

In 1955, North Korea assisted in establishing the General Association of Korean Residents in Japan, Chongryon in Korean, which serves as an advocacy organization for ethnic Koreans in Japan who identify with the DPRK and acts as North Korea's de facto embassy in Japan. Voluntary repatriation of Korean residents from Japan to North Korea progressed slowly but smoothly after the conclusion of the Red Cross agreement of 1959. By late 1960, almost 50,000 of the estimated 600,000 Korean residents had arrived in North Korea aboard chartered Soviet ships. The repatriation program was extended for another year in October 1960 to accommodate the estimated 60,000 still wishing repatriation.

In 1965, the North Korean government sharply criticized the Treaty on Basic Relations between Japan and the Republic of Korea. Under Prime Minister Eisaku Satō, Japanese-North Korean relations underwent a deterioration, but in 1971–1972, the process of Sino-Japanese rapprochement induced Japanese companies to broaden their economic cooperation with the DPRK. Under Prime Minister Kakuei Tanaka, the Japanese government adopted a policy of equidistance toward North Korea and South Korea, and refused to take sides with Seoul against Pyongyang during the Mun Se-gwang affair. Nevertheless, it still refrained from establishing diplomatic relations with North Korea. Under Takeo Miki and his successors, Japan switched back to a policy that clearly favored the ROK over the DPRK. The North Korean leadership felt increasingly isolated when Takeo Fukuda concluded the Treaty of Peace and Friendship between Japan and the People's Republic of China, and Yasuhiro Nakasone visited South Korea in 1983. In periods of Japanese-ROK cooperation and Japanese-DPRK friction, Pyongyang often expressed its dissatisfaction by raising the issue of the Liancourt Rocks dispute.

Until the late 1980s, North Korea's policy toward Japan was mainly aimed at minimizing cooperation between South Korea and Japan, and at deterring Japan's rearmament while striving for closer diplomatic and commercial ties with Japan. Crucial to this policy was the fostering within Japan of support for North Korea, especially among the Japanese who supported the Japanese communist and socialist parties and the Korean residents of Japan.

Over the years, however, North Korea did much to discredit itself in the eyes of many potential supporters in Japan. Japanese who had accompanied their spouses to North Korea had endured severe hardships and were prevented from communicating with relatives and friends in Japan. Japan watched with disdain as North Korea gave safe haven to elements of the Japanese Red Army, which Japan designates as a terrorist group. North Korea's inability or refusal to pay its debts to Japanese traders also reinforced popular Japanese disdain for North Korea.

Japan–North Korea relations turned more antagonistic in the late 1980s. The two governments did not maintain diplomatic relations and had no substantive contacts. The opposition Japan Socialist Party nonetheless had cordial relations with the North Korean regime. Japan allowed trade with North Korea only through unofficial channels, reportedly exceeding US$200 million annually in the 1980s.

Issues in Japan–North Korea relations that produced tensions included North Korean media attacks on Japan, Japan's imposition of economic sanctions on North Korea for terrorist acts against South Korea in the 1980s, and unpaid North Korean debts to Japanese enterprises of about $50 million.

As of 2017, Japan–North Korea relations are at an all-time low after North Korea, on two separate occasions, test-launched nuclear capable ballistic missiles into Japanese waters.

Normalization talks
In the early 1990s, Japan conducted lengthy negotiations with North Korea aimed at establishing diplomatic relations while maintaining its relations with Seoul. In September 1990 Japanese political delegation led by former deputy Prime Minister Shin Kanemaru of the Liberal Democratic Party visited North Korea. Following private meetings between Kanemaru and North Korean leader Kim Il Sung, a joint declaration released on September 28 called for Japan to apologize and to compensate North Korea for its period of colonial rule. Japan and North Korea agreed to begin talks aimed at the establishment of diplomatic relations.

In January 1991, Japan began normalization talks with Pyongyang with a formal apology for its 1910-45 colonial rule of the Korean Peninsula. The negotiations were aided by Tokyo's support of a proposal for simultaneous entry into the United Nations by North Korea and South Korea; the issues of international inspection of North Korean nuclear facilities and the nature and amount of Japanese compensations, however, proved more difficult to negotiate.

Coincidental with the changing patterns in its relations with China and Russia, North Korea has moved to improve its strained relations with Japan. Pyongyang's primary motives appear to be a quest for relief from diplomatic and economic isolation, which has caused serious shortages of food, energy, and hard currency. Normalization of relations with Japan also raises the possibility of North Korea's gaining monetary compensation for the period of Japan's colonial rule (1910–45), a precedent set when Japan normalized relations with South Korea.

The first round of normalization talks was held January 30–31, 1991, but quickly broke down over the question of compensation. Pyongyang has demanded compensation for damages incurred during colonial rule as well as for "sufferings and losses" in the post-World War II period. Japan, however, insists that North Korea first resolve its differences with South Korea over the question of bilateral nuclear inspections. Other points of contention are North Korea's refusal both to provide information about Japanese citizens who had migrated to North Korea with their Korean spouses in the 1960s, and the issue of Japanese soldiers taken prisoner by the Soviets during WWII and sent to North Korea.

Abductions

The abductions of Japanese citizens from Japan by agents of the North Korean government occurred during a period of six years from 1977 to 1983. For many years North Korea denied the abductions, but it admitted to 13 of them in 2002. In one instance, Yi Un Hee, a Korean resident of Japan, was kidnapped to North Korea to teach Japanese in a school for espionage agents. In 2002 and 2004, Prime Minister Junichiro Koizumi made two high-profile visits to Pyongyang to press for their return. North Korea eventually returned five of the thirteen kidnapped, claiming the other eight had died. The positive effect on relations disintegrated when Japan claimed that a DNA test had proved that the returned remains of Megumi Yokota, kidnapped at 13 and said by North Korea to have committed suicide, were in fact not hers. Japan has pressed North Korea to come clean on the abduction, but Pyongyang insists that the issue has already been resolved.

Many North Korean citizens rely on money sent from relatives in Japan. Some in Japan believe that the government should threaten to cut off those remittances to force Pyongyang to make concessions. Others believe that the political right in Japan is exploiting that and other issues to advance its own nationalist agenda.

President Trump brought up the issue at his meeting with Chairman Kim at the request of Prime Minister Abe and he said that "it will be worked on."

Other activity
There have been several confrontations between the two nations over North Korean clandestine activity in Japan besides the abductions including drug smuggling, marine poaching, and spying. North Korean missile tests are a concern for Japan because the missiles sometimes travel through Japanese airspace and territory.

In 1998, North Korea successfully fired a Taepodong-1 ballistic missile that crossed over Japan and landed in the Pacific Ocean. This test launch was viewed as an act of political defiance as negotiations on the future of North Korea's nuclear program development were taking place between North Korea and the United States in New York.

The two states held bilateral talks in September 2007, which were resumed in June 2008.

On March 17, 2017, Japan held the first ever evacuation drill after North Korean missile tests. On the same day, President Trump told North Korea that it was “behaving very badly” shortly after Secretary of State Rex Tillerson hinted at striking North Korea while on a visit to South Korea. In November 2019, North Korea's state media warned that Japan may see a real ballistic missile in the near future after the Japanese Prime Minister Shinzo Abe called Pyongyang's latest test of multiple-rocket launcher a ballistic missile launch. Later, in October 2021 and November 2022, North Korea launched more missiles that landed in Japanese waters.

Six-party talks
On February 13, 2007, the six-party talks produced an agreement in which North Korea agreed to shut down the Yongbyon nuclear facility in exchange for fuel aid and steps towards normalization of relations with both the United States and Japan.

See also

 History of Japan–Korea relations
 Japan–Korea disputes
 Japan–South Korea relations
 Foreign relations of Japan
 Foreign relations of North Korea

References

Further reading
 Cho Soon Sung (1967) "Japan's Two Koreas Policy and the Problems of Korean Unification," Asian Survey 7 (10): 703–725.
 Linus Hagström and Marie Söderberg (2006) North Korea Policy: Japan and the Great Powers, London and New York: Routledge.
 Linus Hagström and Marie Söderberg (2006) The Other Binary: Why Japan–North Korea Relations Matter, Special Issue of Pacific Affairs 79 (3).
 Christopher W. Hughes (1999) Japan's Economic Power and Security: Japan and North Korea. London: Routledge.
 Kim Hong Nack (2006) "The Koizumi Government and the Politics of Normalizing Japanese-North Korean Relations." Working Paper. Honolulu: East-West Center.
 Seung K. Ko (1977), "North Korea's Relations with Japan Since Détente," Pacific Affairs 50 (1): 31–44.

 
North Korea
Bilateral relations of North Korea
North
Relations of colonizer and former colony